Flags and Waves is a short computer animation test clip which was created by animator Bill Reeves and Alain Fournier for Pixar sometime in 1986. The clip included waves reflecting a sunset and lapping against the shore. Reeves and Fournier made the project with the feedback of John Lasseter to work out details of rendering water and waves realistically, including lighting, motion, and shading.

It was first exhibited at SIGGRAPH in Dallas in August 1986, along with Lasseter’s landmark computer animated short Luxo Jr. and another test project Beach Chair, by Eben Ostby. The methods developed during the creation of this project were the basis of the water in Finding Nemo. It is based on an oceanographic model of ocean waves which Fournier dug out of the literature from the nineteenth century.

Flags and Waves can also be found as an easter egg in the Pixar Short Films Collection – Volume 1 which was released in November 2007.

Content
The fourteen-second short begins with the title Flags and Waves and under it the title in French, Drapeaux et Vagues, superimposed on the SMPTE color bars while a high-pitch frequency sound is made. The bars are revealed to be a flag that is flapping in the wind, as the noise shifts to the sound of a calm beachside. The camera then pans up to show three more flags flapping in front of a beach as the bright sun appears to be setting.

References

External links
Flags and Waves on YouTube

1986 films
Pixar short films
1986 short films
1980s American animated films
1986 computer-animated films
American animated short films
Animated films without speech